Peter Beck (born 9 juli 1965) is a Liechtensteiner luger. He competed in the men's singles event at the 1988 Winter Olympics.

References

External links
 

1965 births
Living people
Liechtenstein male lugers
Olympic lugers of Liechtenstein
Lugers at the 1988 Winter Olympics
Place of birth missing (living people)